The 2013 National Hurling League commenced in February 2013.
34 GAA county hurling teams: 32 from Ireland (including Fingal but not Cavan), London and Warwickshire, contested it.

On the final day of fixtures in division 1A on 31 March, all six teams had a chance of either reaching the league semi-finals, or suffering relegation.

Kilkenny won the NHL, defeating Tipperary in the final by 2-17 to 0-20 in the final on 5 May in Nowlan Park.
Michael Fennelly scored two goals and three points in the first half as Kilkenny led by 2-07 to 0-11. In the second half Lar Corbett and JJ Delaney were sent off in the 46th minute after they wrestled each other on the ground near the Kilkenny goal.

On 13 May Kilkenny's Lester Ryan was named as the GAA-GPA Hurler of the League for 2013.
Ryan scored 1-10 in six games from midfield including 0-3 in the semi-final win over Galway and 0-3 in the final victory against Tipperary.

Format

Division 1A: Top three teams qualify for NHL semi-finals. Bottom two teams play a relegation playoff, with the losing team relegated.
Division 1B: Top two teams play division final, with the winner being promoted and qualifying for NHL semi-final. Bottom two teams play a relegation playoff, with the losing team relegated.
Divisions 2A and 3A: Top two teams play division final, with the winner being promoted. Bottom two teams play a relegation playoff, with the losing team relegated.
Divisions 2B: Top two teams play division final, with the winner being promoted. Bottom team relegated.
Division 3B: Top two teams play division final, with the winner being promoted.

The current format of the National Hurling League has been criticised by many including current managers, claiming that it's not benefitting the game in several counties.

Division 1A

Division 1A

Fixtures and results

Division 1 Knockout

Top scorers

Season

Single game

Division 1B

Division 1B

Fixtures and results

Top scorers

Season

Single game

Division 2A

Division 2A

Fixtures and results

Top scorers

Season

Single game

Division 2B

Division 2B

Fixtures and results

Top scorers

Season

Single game

Division 3A

Division 3A

Results

Division 3B

Division 3B

Fixtures and results

Top scorers

Season

Single game

Broadcasting rights
Setanta Sports and TG4 will provide live coverage of matches in Ireland with RTÉ providing highlights on Sunday nights.
Setanta Sports broadcast live matches in Australia. Setanta Sports also provided coverage of matches from the National Hurling League to viewers in Asia.

References

External links
2013 National Hurling League at the GAA
2013 National Hurling League Fixtures at The Score
2013 National Hurling League at GAA Info

 
National Hurling League seasons